Harris Lake or Harris Lake may refer to:

Harris Lake (Berrien County, Michigan)
Harris Lake (New Hill, North Carolina)
Harris Lake (Highlands, North Carolina)
Thomas Lake Harris, an American spiritualistic prophet and poet
Lake Harris (Florida)
Harris Lake (New York), a lake in the Adirondacks that empties into the Hudson River
Lake Harris Campground on Harris Lake, New York
Lake Harris (South Australia), a lake in the Far North region of South Australia
Lake Harris, South Australia, a community established on the shore of Lake Harris
Lake Harris (New Zealand), a lake in the region West Coast in New Zealand
Lake Wedowee, Alabama, also called R. L. Harris Reservoir, or Harris Lake